Yeni Qızılca is a village in the municipality of Qızılca in the Goygol Rayon of Azerbaijan.

References

Populated places in Goygol District